Anwarul Azim may refer to:

 M Anwarul Azim (1931–1971), Bengali industrial administrator
 Anwarul Azim (politician), Bangladeshi politician